Haines Falls is an abandoned train station in Haines Falls, New York. It was owned by the Ulster and Delaware Railroad. The abandoned station was recently restored to perfect condition and painted blue. It is now the headquarters of the Mountain Top Historical Society, one of only two surviving U&D branch stations. It is also the start of the Kaaterskill Rail Trail, a scenic hiking trail along the former railway.

History

Kaaterskill Railroad 
The station was owned by the narrow-gauge Kaaterskill Railroad, MP 6.6, and was one of the busiest stations on the line. It was called Haines Corners Station, as the town's original name was
Haines Corners. It was very busy and was across from a boarding house. It was near a six-span bridge, called the Girder Deck Bridge, which was the largest structure on the railroad. It was right across from another station that was owned by another narrow-gauge railroad. The KRR station soon became a station that belonged to a standard-gauge railroad called the Ulster and Delaware, which turned the Kaaterskill Railroad into a branch, and combined it with a portion of another narrow-gauge railroad, called the Stony Clove and Catskill Mountain Railway.

Ulster and Delaware Railroad 
The station, located at branch MP 18.4, wasn't changed during the period that pre-fabricated stations being erected in between the years of 1900 and 1901. However, the station was causing problems; as passenger trains grew the early 1910s, the State of New York was sending complaints that the station was too small for the town it was serving. In 1913, U&D finally gave in and tore the old station down, making way for a new one, a few hundred feet away.

This new station, branch MP 18.5, looked like the Tannersville station, but it didn't have the portico sticking out of the back. It was a full season passenger station until the New York Central purchased the U&D in 1932. This was when it became a summer-only station, with it being a flagstop in the other seasons. If a passenger were to get picked up at the station in another season, the business and income would be handled by the station agent at Tannersville.

But when the NYC was granted permission by the ICC to abandon the branches in 1939, and to scrap it in 1940, the station was abandoned. However, it was recently restored to perfect condition and painted blue. It is, at present, the headquarters of the Mountain Top Historical Society, and one of only two surviving U&D branch stations.

In 2012, the Ulster & Delaware Railroad Historical Society donated 132 feet of 105lb rail to the Mountain Top Historical Society so that a display track could be built on the former railroad right-of-way besides the station.

It was listed on the National Register of Historic Places in 1996 as the Ulster and Delaware Railroad Station.

The area is currently under development as a hiking track called the Kaaterskill Rail Trail. The first phase is a 1.5 mile section between the Mountain Top Historical Society property and DEC land at the end of Laurel House Road. Eventually there will be a link from Haines Falls to the North and South Lake Campground offering multiple views of Kaaterskill Falls.

Bibliography

References

External links

 Ulster & Delaware Haines Fall Railroad Station (2009)

Railway stations in the Catskill Mountains
Railway stations on the National Register of Historic Places in New York (state)
Former Ulster and Delaware Railroad stations
Railway stations in the United States opened in 1883
1883 establishments in New York (state)
Railway stations in Greene County, New York
Former railway stations in New York (state)
Railway stations closed in 1940